Neale Francis Lunderville is a government official from the state of Vermont.

He served as the Secretary of the Agency of Administration under Governor Jim Douglas.  Before being appointed Administration Secretary in 2008, he served as the Secretary of the Vermont Agency of Transportation from 2006 to 2008, and as the Secretary of Civil & Military Affairs under Governor Douglas. Neale served as the recovery officer for Vermont after Hurricane Irene in 2011.

Personal
Lunderville was born in Burlington, Vermont. He graduated from American University in Washington, D.C. with a degree in Political Science.

References

People from Burlington, Vermont
Living people
State cabinet secretaries of Vermont
Year of birth missing (living people)